Joseph Eladio Chavarría Rodríguez (born 14 October 1992) is a Costa Rican cyclist.

Major results

2009
 2nd Road race, National Junior Road Championships
2014
 National Road Championships
1st  Under-23 road race
2nd Road race
 5th Overall Vuelta Ciclista a Costa Rica
1st  Young rider classification
2015
 5th Overall Vuelta Ciclista a Costa Rica
1st Stages 4 & 5 (ITT)
2016
 1st  Road race, National Road Championships
 1st  Overall Vuelta al Táchira
 4th Overall Vuelta Ciclista a Costa Rica
 7th Overall Vuelta a la Independencia Nacional
2017
 5th Overall Vuelta Ciclista a Costa Rica
2018
 1st  Road race, National Road Championships
 8th Overall Vuelta Ciclista a Costa Rica
2022
 3rd Road race, National Road Championships

References

External links

1992 births
Living people
Costa Rican male cyclists